The Centrist Democrats was a political party in Austria.

History
The only election contested by the party was the 1919 Constitutional Assembly elections, in which it received 1.6% of the national vote and won a single seat.

References

Defunct political parties in Austria
Political parties with year of disestablishment missing
Political parties with year of establishment missing
Defunct liberal political parties in Austria
Radical parties